Jimmy Eat World is the debut studio album by the American rock band of the same name, released in December 1994 on Wooden Blue Records, limited to 2,000 copies. The album displays their early sound with guitarist and eventual backing vocalist Tom Linton singing lead on most of the songs on this album. The one song on this album that is sung by current primary vocalist Jim Adkins is the track "Usery". The album also marks the only appearance of former bass guitarist Mitch Porter.

The album cover is an old picture of Linton's younger brothers Jim and Ed, from whom the band's name originated.

Reception
In 2012, The A.V. Clubs Jason Heller noted, "It's long been out of print, and there’s a good reason for it. It’s not terrible, but it doesn't represent what the band would become."

Track listing

PersonnelJimmy Eat WorldJim Adkins – lead guitar, backing vocals, lead vocals on "Usery"
Zachary Lind – drums, accordion
Thomas Linton – lead vocals, rhythm guitar, backing vocals on "Usery"
Mitchel Porter – bass guitarAdditional personnel'
Sarah Pont – violin on "Usery"
Steve Naugton – engineer
Larry Elyea – mastering
Craig Robeson – photography
Jim Schroeder – design

References

1994 debut albums
Jimmy Eat World albums
Wooden Blue Records albums
Skate punk albums